Jack Raymond Martin (born November 29, 1940) is a Canadian retired professional ice hockey centre who played in one National Hockey League game for the Toronto Maple Leafs during the 1960–61 season, on November 27, 1960 against the Detroit Red Wings. The rest of his career, which lasted from 1960 to 1965, was spent in the minor leagues.

Career statistics

Regular season and playoffs

See also
List of players who played only one game in the NHL

External links
 

1940 births
Living people
Canadian ice hockey centres
Charlotte Checkers (EHL) players
Ice hockey people from Ontario
Knoxville Knights players
Nashville Dixie Flyers players
Pittsburgh Hornets players
San Francisco Seals (ice hockey) players
Sault Thunderbirds players
Sportspeople from St. Catharines
Sudbury Wolves (EPHL) players
Toronto Maple Leafs players
Toronto Marlboros players
Toronto St. Michael's Majors players